Afric Aviation SARL was a regional airline based in Port Gentil, Gabon.  All flights were suspended in May 2017, due to financial difficulties.

Its main base was/is Port-Gentil International Airport.

On August 5, 2015, the company's co-founder and CEO Alfred-Pierre Etouké was sentenced to 3 months of jail time for embezzlement. The verdict coming after a series of lawsuits between Étouké and co-founder Alain Regourd.

Afric Aviation would finish 2015 as the leading domestic passenger transporter in Gabon, carrying 99 413 passengers in the third trimester of 2015, narrowly avoided dethroning Air France as Gabon's biggest overall passenger carrier, which carried 100 884 passengers during the same time period.

Despite the large number of passengers carried, the airline fell to a financial crisis hitting Gabon, which lead to some of its clients defaulting on loans. This financial pressure coincided with the grounding of the airline's only airplane due to technical faults, as well as the unexpected termination of its leasing contract. The airline suspended flights due to these financial difficulties. While the suspension was supposed to last only 6 months, the airline was never recertified.

Destinations

Gabon
Port-Gentil International Airport
Libreville International Airport
Gamba Airport
M'Vengue El Hadj Omar Bongo Ondimba International Airport in Franceville

Fleet
The Afric Aviation fleet consisted of one aircraft at the time of its operations being suspended.

The airline fleet previously included the following aircraft:
 1 ATR 42
 1 Embraer EMB 120 Brasilia
 1 Embraer 190

References

External links
Official website
Official website ('site closed')

Defunct airlines of Gabon
Airlines established in 2011
Airlines disestablished in 2017
Airlines formerly banned in the European Union
Gabonese companies established in 2011